Zaboli Mahalleh-ye Mahastan (also Romanized as Zābolī Maḩalleh-ye Māhastān) is a village in Katul Rural District, in the Central District of Aliabad County, Golestan Province, Iran. At the 2006 census, its population was 522, in 125 families.

References 

Populated places in Aliabad County